Henochilus wheatlandii is a species of characin endemic to Brazil where native to the Mucuri and Doce River basins. It is a Critically Endangered species, and now restricted to the Santo Antônio River, a tributary of the Doce River. It is the only species in the genus Henochilus.

It is a critically endangered species, and had been considered extinct for more than a century, until rediscovered in 1996. This species is known to feed on plants.

The fish is named in honor of Henry Wheatland (1812-1893), who was President of the Essex Institute in Salem, Mass., USA, which published the description of the fish.

References

Characidae
Monotypic ray-finned fish genera
Characiformes genera
Fish of the Mucuri River basin
Fish of the Doce River basin
Endemic fauna of Brazil
Taxa named by Samuel Garman 
Fish described in 1890